Nurul Izzah binti Anwar (born 19 November 1980) is a Malaysian politician who has served as Co-chairperson of the Secretariat of the Special Advisory Body to the Minister of Finance Anwar Ibrahim since February 2023. She served as Senior Advisor to the Prime Minister Anwar on Economics and Finance from January to her resignation in February 2023, the Member of Parliament (MP) for Permatang Pauh from May 2018 to November 2022 and for Lembah Pantai from March 2008 to May 2018. A member of the People's Justice Party (PKR), a component party of the Pakatan Harapan (PH) and formerly Pakatan Rakyat (PR) opposition coalitions. She has also served as the Vice President of PKR from November 2010 to her resignation in December 2018 and again since July 2022. She also served as Chairperson of the Consideration of Bills Select Committee from December 2018 to July 2019. She is the eldest child and daughter of Prime Minister, Chairman of PH, President of PKR and Tambun MP Anwar and President of PH, Chairwoman of the PKR Advisory Body and Bandar Tun Razak MP Wan Azizah Wan Ismail who are also both the former deputy prime ministers.

Family background
Nurul Izzah is the daughter of Anwar Ibrahim, former Deputy Prime Minister of Malaysia, current President of PKR and current Prime Minister of Malaysia. Her mother, Wan Azizah Wan Ismail, was the outgoing President of the party and former Deputy Prime Minister of Malaysia and also former Minister of Women, Family and Community Development.

Education
Prior to being an MP, Nurul Izzah was and still is a strong proponent of human and civil rights with a special interest in prisoners of religious prejudice. Prior to entering politics, Nurul Izzah did her bachelor's degree in Electrical and Electronic Engineering from the Universiti Tenaga Nasional where she graduated from in 2003. She then furthered her studies in the U.S. and earned her master's degree from the School for Advanced International Studies at Johns Hopkins University studying International Relations specializing in Southeast Asia Studies.

Political career

Vice President of the People's Justice Party (2010–2018 & 2022–present) 
Nurul Izzah's political career began with the creation of the People's Justice Party (KEADILAN or PKR) in 1999 where she played a vital role in its establishment and, up until December 2018, was on her second term as highest ranking Vice President Elect, as well as the party's Election Director – a post she holds jointly with Saifuddin Nasution Ismail (former Party Secretary-General).

Resignation as Vice President of PKR and from other party positions
On 17 December 2018, Nurul Izzah announced her resignation as the party's vice president as well as chair of its Penang chapter, but retains her post as MP of Permatang Pauh.

Nurul Izzah is the founding member for the Trans-Pacific Partnership Agreement Caucus; and Women's Caucus respectively. She also holds the position of Honorary Treasurer on behalf of the Inter-Parliamentary Union Malaysia. She has also moved the Parliamentary Bill in Malaysia's Parliament to Revoke Emergency Declarations in the country, including the eventual abolishment of the Internal Security Act – all of which were adopted by the Prime Minister six months later. Granted, other laws were then re-introduced, in line with Malaysia's semi-autocratic regime.

Nurul Izzah is also a Board of Director for the Centre of Reform, Democracy and Social Initiatives and has founded Akademi Manusiawi, a training centre for future activists and politicians.

Nurul Izzah has worked with a number of agencies and institutes on advocacy work, among them are the Muslim Youth Movement of Malaysia (ABIM), Suara Rakyat Malaysia (SUARAM), Women Leaders International Forum (WLIF) and Friedrich-Ebert-Stiftung (FES). She has in the past advocated on behalf of Malaysian political prisoners and Malaysian human rights movements at the international level, most noted being an intervention in the main session at the 55th Commission on Human Rights, Geneva.

Nurul Izzah also actively contributes to the Malay publication Sinar – continuously educating the electorate with positive thoughts on reform.

She was replaced as chairperson by Bukit Gelugor MP, Ramkarpal Singh, in July 2019.

Return as Vice President of PKR
On 20 July 2022, 3 days after the PKR party elections officially ended, she was appointed to the PKR vice presidency along with two new officeholders Putatan MP Awang Husaini Sahari and Saraswathy Kandasamy which she resigned nearly 4 years prior on 17 December 2018.

Election
In the 2008 general election, Nurul Izzah contested the seat of Lembah Pantai in Kuala Lumpur. There was speculation that she ran for the seat with the intention of handing it over to her father, who was disqualified from running for office until April 2008, though she quickly rejected such claims. The seat was defended by three-term incumbent Shahrizat Abdul Jalil, who was Minister for Women, Family and Community Development in the Barisan Nasional government. Initial reports suggested that Shahrizat would retain the seat, as she had been a popular minister, and in the 2004 election retained her seat with a majority of 15,288. However, on polling day, Nurul Izzah won 21,728 votes to Shahrizat's 18,833, and was elected as the new MP for Lembah Pantai. The defeat of the powerful three-term incumbent by a new face was one of the many surprises in the 2008 election, which saw significant losses of parliamentary seats by the ruling party. When her father returned to electoral politics he did so by replacing his wife and Nurul Izzah's mother, Wan Azizah, in a by-election for the Penang-based seat of Permatang Pauh.

In November 2010, Nurul Izzah was elected one of the vice-presidents of Parti Keadilan Rakyat. She was narrowly returned to Parliament in the 2013 election. The governing Barisan Nasional coalition had targeted her by fielding the incumbent Federal Territories Minister Raja Nong Chik Zainal Abidin as its candidate against her in a high-profile campaign.

In November 2015, Princess Jacel Kiram and Nurul Izzah posted a photo demanding Malaysian Prime Minister Najib Razak to free opposition leader Anwar Ibrahim which was received negatively in the media, prompting Nurul Izzah to apologize.

In May 2018, Nurul Izzah contested for the parliamentary seat of  Permatang Pauh in Pulau Pinang and won. She as the MP for Permatang Pauh from 2018 until her defeat in 2022.

Personal life
Nurul Izzah married Raja Ahmad Shahrir on 9 May 2003, and has two children together, namely Raja Safiyah and Raja Harith. They were officially divorced by the Syariah High Court in January 2015.

She later remarried Yin Shao Loong, on 5 August 2022 and has a stepchild from Yin's previous marriage.

Election results

See also

Consideration of Bills Select Committee (Malaysia)
Permatang Pauh (federal constituency)
Lembah Pantai (federal constituency)

References

External links
 

Living people
1980 births
Anwar Ibrahim family
Johns Hopkins University alumni
Malaysian civil rights activists
Malaysian democracy activists
Women members of the Dewan Rakyat
Women in Kuala Lumpur politics
Malaysian Muslims
Malaysian people of Malay descent
People's Justice Party (Malaysia) politicians
Members of the Dewan Rakyat
21st-century Malaysian politicians
21st-century Malaysian women politicians